The ARM Cortex-A510 is the successor to the ARM Cortex-A55 and the first ARMv9 high efficiency “LITTLE” CPU.  It is the companion to the ARM Cortex-A710 "big" core. It's a 64-bit instruction set clean-sheet CPU designed by ARM Holdings' Cambridge design team.

Design:

 3-wide in-order design, the Cortex-A55 was 2-wide.
3-wide fetch and decode front-end as well as 3-wide issue and execute on the back-end, which includes 3 ALU's.

Improvements:

 35% performance uplift compared to Cortex-A55
 20% more energy efficient than Cortex-A55
 3x ML uplift

Power efficiency and performance is further improved in a 2022 refresh.

References 

ARM processors